Leonard Arthur Davidson (born 30 May 1944 in Enfield, Middlesex, England) is an English musician and songwriter, best known as the guitarist for the Dave Clark Five.

Career 

Davidson was born in Enfield as one of three children. He started playing the guitar when he was a teenager. After leaving school, he worked at a company that made steel pipes. In 1961 he joined 'The Dave Clark Five with Stan Saxon', the forerunner of The Dave Clark Five.  

According to Mike Smith (the DC5's lead singer and keyboardist), Dave Clark was looking for a lead guitarist and asked Smith if he knew anybody. Smith recommended Davidson saying there was no one better. Smith and Davidson had worked together in a previous band.

In 1963, the Dave Clark Five signed to EMI and released their debut album Glad All Over in March 1964. In total, the group appeared on The Ed Sullivan Show 18 times, more than any over British Invasion group. He was one of three members of the group who wrote songs. He wrote their 1965 hit "Catch Us If You Can", and contributed five more tunes on the Catch Us If You Can soundtrack album, although Davidson was the only member of the group not to have one single line of dialogue in the film.  The Dave Clark Five were one of the first leading groups in The British Invasion, cultural phenomenon of the mid-1960s, when rock and pop acts from the United Kingdom and other aspects of British culture became popular in the United States.  

He co-wrote five songs, including "Crying Over You" and "When" to their 1965 Coast to Coast album, and sang lead on the 1967 hit "Everybody Knows" which reached number 2 on the UK Singles Chart. Lenny sang co-lead with Smith on their Because. The Dave Clark Five sold more than 100 million records and scored 15 consecutive Top 20 U.S. hit singles. The Dave Clark Five were big competitors with The Beatles during 1963 and 1964, knocking many of their songs off the number one spot on numerous music charts. The Dave Clark Five broke up in 1970, but was quickly reformed by Clark and Smith as "Dave Clark and Friends".

Personal life 
After the Dave Clark Five broke up in 1970, Davidson later relearned the guitar and became a music teacher in Hertfordshire, and also owned a company that provided repair and maintenance services for church organs. Following the death of Clark Five bassist Rick Huxley on 11 February 2013, Davidson and Clark are the last surviving members. He also owned an Antique shop, as stated by Mike Smith.

Rock and Roll Hall of Fame 
Davidson was inducted as part of the group into the Rock and Roll Hall of Fame in March 2008 along with the then fellow surviving band members Dave Clark and Rick Huxley. Mike Smith died 11 days before the ceremony from Pneumonia aged 64. Davidson mentioned that they arrived in New York City for the ceremony on 8 March, exactly 44 years after the group's first appearance on The Ed Sullivan Show. Lenny also told a story of when the five went to see Ella Fitzgerald perform at the same hall the ceremony was held at, and the audience having to evacuate when a curtain caught fire from a lit cigarette.

Discography 

 A Session with the Dave Clark Five (1964)
 Catch Us If You Can (1965)
 Everybody Knows (1967)
 5 by 5 (1968)
 If Somebody Loves You (1970)

References

External links 

1942 births
Living people
People from Enfield, London
English rock guitarists
The Dave Clark Five members
20th-century English musicians
Musicians from London
Beat musicians
Age controversies